Wire binding is a popular commercial book binding method, and is known by a number of different names including twin loop wire, wire-o, double loop wire, double-o, ring wire and wirebind. With this binding method, users insert their punched pages onto a "C" shaped spine and then use a wire closer to squeeze the spine until it is round. Documents that are bound with wire binding will open completely flat on a desk and allow for 360 degree rotation of bound pages.

Hole patterns and pitches
There are three common hole patterns used in binding documents with double loop wire.  Each hole pattern has specific sizes and applications where it is best suited.  Here is a quick overview of the different options.

3:1 pitch (3 holes per inch)
The three to one pitch hole pattern is most commonly used for binding small sized documents with double loop wire. The hole pattern used for 3:1 pitch wire binding can use either square or round holes.

2:1 pitch (2 holes per inch)
Although a two to one pitch hole pattern is most commonly used for binding larger sized documents it can also be used for binding smaller diameter books. RENZ GmbH own the registered trademark for One Pitch® which is a brand describing the small 2:1 pitch wires 1/4" through to 1/2".

19 loop wire
In the past, some comb binding machines would come with a wire closer. These machines were designed to be used with 19 loop wire. Nineteen loop wire is designed to be used with a plastic comb binding pattern. This style of binding used to be referred to as Ibiwire which was Ibico's name for this style of binding. However, when Ibico was purchased by the General Binding Corporation this type of supplies was discontinued. Today, 19-loop wire is commonly called Spiral-O Wire.

Wire binding equipment
In order to bind documents with double loop wire a binding machine and a wire closer are required.  Smaller organizations will often choose a small manual wire binding machine that offers a manual hole punch and a built in wire closer.  Medium-sized users will often choose a wire binding machine with an electric punch and built in wire closer.  The highest volume wire binding users such as binderies, print shops and in-plant printers will usually separate the punching and finishing stages of the binding process in order to increase productivity.  These users will often use a heavy duty modular interchangeable die punch or an automated punching system along with either a manual or an electric wire closing machine.

References

Bookbinding